Lukas Pulpan (born June 23, 1985) is a Czech professional ice hockey defenceman. He played three seasons (2004–07) with HC Plzen in the Czech Extraliga.

Awards and honours

References

External links

1985 births
Czech ice hockey defencemen
Living people
Vancouver Giants players
HC Plzeň players
Sportspeople from Plzeň
Piráti Chomutov players
HC Berounští Medvědi players
Sportovní Klub Kadaň players
HC Karlovy Vary players
MsHK Žilina players
Czech expatriate ice hockey players in Slovakia